Wotherton is a hamlet in west Shropshire, close to the Welsh border. It is in the civil parish of Chirbury with Brompton. Its name, mentioned as a manor in Domesday means, roughly, "settlement at a woodland ford"; the road through the village crosses a small stream.

The Wotherton Barytes Mine operated here until 1911.

See also
Listed buildings in Chirbury with Brompton

References

Villages in Shropshire